Wilmette is the name of a commuter railroad station in Wilmette, Illinois that is served by Metra's Union Pacific North Line. Trains go south to Ogilvie Transportation Center and as far north as Kenosha, Wisconsin. Travel time to Ogilvie is 31 minutes on local trains, and as little as 27 minutes on morning inbound trains and 22 minutes on one afternoon inbound train. In Metra's zone-based fare system, Wilmette is in zone C. As of 2018, Wilmette was the 18th busiest of Metra's 236 non-downtown stations, with an average of 1,653 weekday boardings.

The station is located at Green Bay Road and Washington Avenue in Wilmette's central business district. It is also in close proximity to the Wilmette Village Hall. Northbound trains stop on the west platform and southbound trains stop on the east platform. The closest CTA Purple Line station is Linden, about a mile away.

As of April 25, 2022, Wilmette is served by all 35 trains in each direction on weekdays, by 12 trains in each direction on Saturdays, and by all nine trains in each direction on Sundays.

History 
The first railroad station in Wilmette opened in 1871 at a cost of $700.  In 1875, it took 30 minutes to get to Chicago (about the same as now), and the fare was 11 cents (adult one-way tickets cost $3.05 in 2006) and $5.50 as of February 2018. The former station has been on the National Register of Historic Places since 1975.

The present Metra station in Wilmette opened in 2001.

Bus connections 
Pace
  213 Green Bay Road 
  421 Wilmette Avenue (weekday rush hours only)
  422 Linden CTA/Glenview/Northbrook Court (weekdays only)

References

External links 
Metra – Wilmette
Station from Central Avenue from Google Maps Street View
Station from Lake Avenue from Google Maps Street View

Buildings and structures in Wilmette, Illinois
Metra stations in Illinois
Railway stations in Cook County, Illinois
Railway stations in the United States opened in 1871
Union Pacific North Line